The Puddephatt House is a historic house at 1820 South Olive Street in Pine Bluff, Arkansas.  It is a two-story American Foursquare structure with American Craftsman styling, designed by Charles L. Thompson and built about 1911.  Instead of the more typical Colonial Revival styling found in this type of house, the front porch has Craftsman-style square brick posts, and the roof has dormers with false half-timbering.

The house was listed on the National Register of Historic Places in 1982.

See also
National Register of Historic Places listings in Jefferson County, Arkansas

References

Houses completed in 1911
Houses in Pine Bluff, Arkansas
Houses on the National Register of Historic Places in Arkansas
National Register of Historic Places in Pine Bluff, Arkansas